Ven Shankhu Pol is a 2011 Indian Malayalam-language family drama film directed by Asok R. Nath, starring Suresh Gopi, Manoj K Jayan, Jyothirmayi and Meera Nandan in the lead roles. This film also turned out to be the last Malayalam film of late Malayalam actor Murali. The film was initially titled Ekadasi and produced by Sandeep R Nair before it was sold on outright basis to producer Sanal Thottam.

Plot
Ven Shankhu Pol is the story of Nandan, a war reporter, who is facing a fatal disease.

Cast
 Suresh Gopi as Nandan 
 Murali
 Manoj K Jayan
 Jyothirmayi as Indu 
 Meera Nandan as Aswathy 
 Anoop Menon
 Lalu Alex
 Chembil Ashokan
 Sukumari
 Sreekutty

References

External links
 Bizhat report
 FilmiBeat

2010s Malayalam-language films